Joseph Edward McCarthy (November 14, 1876 – September 8, 1955) was an American prelate of the Roman Catholic Church.  He served as the sixth bishop of the Diocese of Portland in Maine from 1932 until his death in 1955.

Biography

Early life 
Joseph McCarthy was born on November 14, 1876, in Waterbury, Connecticut. He attended Holy Cross College in Worcester, Massachusetts.  McCarthy was ordained to the priesthood in Paris by Bishop Félix-Jules-Xavier Jourdan de la Passardière for the Archdiocese of Hartford on July 4, 1903. He then taught Greek and French at St. Thomas Seminary in Bloomfield, Connecticut.

Bishop of Portland 
On May 13, 1932, McCarthy was appointed bishop of the Diocese of Portland by Pope Pius XI. He received his episcopal consecration on August 24, 1932, from Bishop Maurice F. McAuliffe, with Bishops John  Nilan and John Peterson serving as co-consecrators. McCarthy's consecration was the first to be broadcast by radio in the United States.

During the Great Depression, McCarthy used his power as a corporation sole to remove the burden of debt by offering the property holdings as security for a successful bond issue. By 1936 he had stabilized the financial situation of the diocese. 

In 1938, McCarthy purchased the former Portland home of railroad executive Morris McDonald as his official residence. He opened numerous elementary schools, high schools, and colleges during his tenure. He received Daniel Feeney as an auxiliary bishop in 1946, delegating much of the administration of the diocese to Feeny due to his own declining health.

Joseph McCarthy died in Portland, Maine, on September 8, 1955, at age 78. He is buried in Waterbury.

References

1876 births
1955 deaths
College of the Holy Cross alumni
People from Waterbury, Connecticut
Roman Catholic bishops of Portland
20th-century Roman Catholic bishops in the United States
Catholics from Connecticut